The gens Strabonia was an obscure plebeian family at ancient Rome.  No members of this gens are mentioned by ancient writers, but several are known from inscriptions.

Origin
The surname Strabo was originally applied to a person known for squinting, part of a large group of cognomina deriving from the physical traits and characteristics of an individual.

Praenomina
All of the Strabonii found in inscriptions bear common praenomina, including Gaius, Publius, Titus, and Quintus.

Members

 Strabonia, probably the mother of [...]ennius, a person buried at Perusia in Etruria.
 Gaius Strabonius, dedicated a monument at Vazuanis in Numidia for his wife, Octavia Successa, aged seventy.
 Strabonius Datianus, a soldier in the first urban cohort at Rome, mentioned in a monument from Tunes in Africa Proconsularis, dating from AD 230.
 Strabonia Euphrosyne, dedicated a monument for her friend, Caesidia Ionis, at Vicohabentia in Cisalpine Gaul, dating to the late second or early third century.
 Strabonia C. l. Eutychia, a freedwoman buried at Julia Concordia in Venetia and Histria, in a late first- or early second-century tomb dedicated by Vettia Anthis.
 Publius Strabonius P. f. Eutychus, buried at Rome, along with his sisters, Vipsania Glypte and Munia Trophime, in a tomb built by their father, Publius Strabonius Primigenius.
 Quintus Strabonius Honoratianus, buried at Bulla Regia in Africa Proconsularis.
 Publius Strabonius Primigenius, dedicated a sepulchre at Rome for his children, Vipsania Glypte, Publius Strabonius Eutychus, and Munia Trophime.
 Titus Strabonius Primigenius, together with his wife, Quinta Laodamia, dedicated a second-century tomb at Rome for their daughter, Strabonia Venusta.
 Strabonia Prisca, the mistress of Clado, a slave named in an inscription from Alba Fucens in Sabinum.
 Strabonia Secundilla, along with her daughter, Trebius Rufilla, dedicated a tomb at Trasacco in Sabinum to her husband, Gaius Trebius Optatus.
 Gaius Strabonius C. l. Tremissus, a freedman named in an inscription from Ateste in Venetia and Histria.
 Strabonia Venusta, dedicated a tomb at Rome for Titus Statilius Clarus, her husband of fourteen years.
 Strabonia T. f. Venusta, buried at Rome, aged nine years, six months, in a second-century tomb dedicated by her parents, Titus Strabonius Primigenius and Quinta Laodamia.
 Strabonia Victorina, buried at the present site of Lendava, formerly part of Pannonia Superior, aged thirty-nine, with a monument from her husband, Gaius Julius Severinus, a veteran of the Legio I Adiutrix.  In an adjoining tomb was their friend, Gaius Ulpius Licinius.

See also
 List of Roman gentes

References

Bibliography
 Theodor Mommsen et alii, Corpus Inscriptionum Latinarum (The Body of Latin Inscriptions, abbreviated CIL), Berlin-Brandenburgische Akademie der Wissenschaften (1853–present).
 Supplementa Italica (Supplement for Italy), Unione Accademica Nazionale.
 René Cagnat et alii, L'Année épigraphique (The Year in Epigraphy, abbreviated AE), Presses Universitaires de France (1888–present).
 George Davis Chase, "The Origin of Roman Praenomina", in Harvard Studies in Classical Philology, vol. VIII, pp. 103–184 (1897).

Roman gentes